Miss Grand Cambodia 2016 was the second edition of the Miss Grand Cambodia beauty pageant, held at the Nagaworld Hotel in Phnom Penh, on June 30, 2016. Twenty-five contestants, who qualified for the national contest through online screening, competed for the title, of whom a 19-year-old nursing student from Phnom Penh, Heng Chantha, was named the winner, and was expected to represent the country at the Miss Grand International 2016 pageant in Las Vegas, Nevada, however, her visa application was rejected by the U.S. Immigration and Customs Enforcement caused her to withdraw from the competition.

The event was broadcast live to the audience nationwide on MyTV.

Result

References

External links 

 
Miss Grand Cambodia
Grand Cambodia